Noël Sinibaldi (10 January 1920 – 28 October 2003) was a French football player and manager.

Early and personal life
Born in Montemaggiore, Corsica, Sinibaldi's two brothers Pierre and Paul were also footballers.

Career
Sinibaldi played who played as a striker for Nîmes, Toulouse, Reims, Cannes, Angers and Draguignan. He also managed Draguignan.

References

1920 births
2003 deaths
French footballers
Association football forwards
Nîmes Olympique players
Toulouse FC players
Stade de Reims players
AS Cannes players
Angers SCO players
SC Draguignan players
Ligue 2 players
Ligue 1 players
French football managers
SC Draguignan managers
Sportspeople from Haute-Corse
Footballers from Corsica